Langelurillus cedarbergensis is a jumping spider species of the genus Langelurillus that lives in South Africa. Only the female has been described.

References

Endemic fauna of South Africa
Salticidae
Spiders described in 2013
Spiders of South Africa
Taxa named by Wanda Wesołowska